The Turkish Parliament Speaker elections of November 2015 took place on 22 November 2015 to elect the 27th Speaker of the Grand National Assembly, who will preside over the proceedings of the 26th Parliament of Turkey elected in the 1 November 2015 general election.

Conduct

Motion to delay
İdris Baluken, a parliamentary group leader of the People's Democratic Party (HDP), raised a motion to delay the speaker election on the grounds that two HDP MPs were on hunger strike in the district of Nusaybin, Mardin Province, which had entered its tenth day of military curfew. Baluken claimed that this would result in the election outcome not being representative of the parliamentary composition. Interim speaker Deniz Baykal however rejected the motion regarding it as irrelevant to the parliamentary agenda.

Results

See also
Deputy Speaker of the Grand National Assembly

References

2015 elections in Turkey
Speaker elections in Turkey